Al Jazirah is a settlement in Sharjah.

References

External links

Populated places in the Emirate of Sharjah